Parvan may refer to:
Vasile Pârvan, Romanian historian and archaeologist
Parvān Province, Afghanistan
Parvan, Iran, a village in Qazvin Province
Parvan, Targovishte Province, a village in Targovishte Province, Bulgaria